UFC 25: Ultimate Japan 3 was a mixed martial arts event held by the Ultimate Fighting Championship on April 14, 2000 at the Yoyogi National Gymnasium in Tokyo, Japan.

History
The event was the third UFC event to be held in Japan. 

UFC 25 was headlined by a fight between Tito Ortiz and Wanderlei Silva, held to determine the new Light Heavyweight Champion following Frank Shamrock's retirement from the UFC. 

The Octagon announcer was local Sanshiro Matuyama instead of the regular Bruce Buffer.

The event featured the first UFC appearance of future UFC Middleweight Champion Murilo Bustamante, as well as future PRIDE fighter Ikuhisa Minowa. 

This event also contained an interview with John Perretti, the UFC matchmaker at the time.

UFC 25 was initially seen live on pay-per-view. Spike published a DVD release of UFC 25 exclusively in Japan, with a wider video release occurring after UFC was purchased by Zuffa years later as part of a DVD collection covering events initially unreleased by SEG Sports due to their financial difficulties leading to the sale.

Results

See also 
 Ultimate Fighting Championship
 List of UFC champions
 List of UFC events
 2000 in UFC

External links
Official UFC website

Ultimate Fighting Championship events
2000 in mixed martial arts
Mixed martial arts in Japan
Sports competitions in Tokyo
2000 in Japanese sport
April 2000 sports events in Asia